William Burnet Wright (April 15, 1838 in Cincinnati – 1924) was an American Congregational clergyman from Ohio. His works include Master and Men, published in 1894.

References

External links

1838 births
1924 deaths
American Congregationalist ministers
People from Cincinnati